Myrmarachne luctuosa is a species of spider in the jumping spider family (Salticidae), found in New South Wales, Australia.

References

Spiders of Australia
Salticidae
Spiders described in 1879